8th Division, 8th Infantry Division or 8th Armored Division may refer to:

Infantry divisions
 8th Division (Australia) 
 8th Canadian Infantry Division
 8th Air Division (People's Republic of China)
 8th Division (1st Formation) (People's Republic of China), 1949–1952
 8th Infantry Division (France)  
 8th Division (German Empire) 
 8th Ersatz Division (German Empire) 
 8th Landwehr Division (German Empire) 
 8th Bavarian Reserve Division, a unit of the Imperial German Army in World War I
 8th Infantry Division (Greece)
 8th (Lucknow) Division, a unit of the British Indian Army before and during World War I
 8th Infantry Division (India) 
 8th Najaf Ashraf Division, Iran
 8th Division (Iraq) 
 8th Division (Imperial Japanese Army)
 8th Division (Japan)
 8th Division (North Korea) 
 8th Infantry Division (Pakistan), part of XXX Corps
 8th Infantry Division (Philippines)
 8th Infantry Division (Poland)
 8th Infantry Division (Russian Empire)
 8th Siberian Rifle Division (Russian Empire)
 8th Infantry Division (South Korea)
 8th Rifle Division (Soviet Union), Soviet Union
 8th Guards Airborne Division, Soviet Union
 8th Guards Rifle Division, later 8th Guards Motor Rifle Division, Soviet Union
 8th Motor Rifle Division NKVD
 8th Infantry Division (United Kingdom) 
 8th Infantry Division (United States) 
 8th Jäger Division (Wehrmacht), Germany 
 8th Mountain Division (Wehrmacht), Germany
 8th Parachute Division (Germany)

Cavalry divisions
 8th Cavalry Division (German Empire)
 8th SS Cavalry Division Florian Geyer (Germany) 
 8th Cavalry Division (Russian Empire)

Armoured divisions
 8th Armored Brigade (People's Republic of China), originally the 8th Tank Division
 8th Armoured Division (South Africa)
 8th Armoured Division (United Kingdom)
 8th Armored Division (United States)
 8th Panzer Division (Wehrmacht), Germany

Aviation divisions
 8th Air Division, United States

Other divisions
 8th Anti-Aircraft Division (United Kingdom)